Jasenko Đorđrević is an artist from Tuzla, Bosnia and Herzegovina who was born on June 9, 1983. Jasenko is one of the few people in the world who specialize in making sculptures on the tip of a pencil (the graphite part). He goes by a pseudonym TOLDart. He has made more than 200 sculptures and still continues to make more. Jasenko still lives in Tuzla working as an aikido instructor. Because of some connections that he has made with people in different countries he travels around Europe on his exhibitions. He has been making sculptures for a long time, but quite recently he became popular through social media and since then he has been invited to Norway, Greece, Germany and many other places.

Commencement 

In January 2010, his brother sent him a link with the artworks of an American artist called Dalton Ghetti and challenged him to try and make something similar. He liked the idea and accepted the challenge. The next day he sent to his brother one sculpture with a note “I told you so”. Since then he has been making sculptures. He has always been fascinated by miniature. As a child he used to make small books (about 5mm), small sculptures and micro-origami. He made one origami figure for the Guinness book of world records. It was a paper boat about 1.5mm by 2.5mm but the dimensions of the boat itself were about 1mm. Although it didn't make it into the Guinness book of world record they said that they never seen anything like it. CNN wrote about his artworks. At the end of the year 2013 he won two awards (the sculpture award and the Grand Prix award) at the international exhibition called "7th biennale of miniature  art BiH"

Exhibitions

Solo exhibitions 

 2014 Tuzla Bosnia and Herzegovina Bosnian Cultural Center of Tuzla Canton
 2015 Kalesija Bosnia and Herzegovina Bosnian Cultural Center Kalesija
 2015 Tuzla Bosnia and Herzegovina Peace Flame House Tuzla 
 2016 Sarajevo Bosnia and Herzegovina Unon Bank˙s Exhibition space
 2016 Portåsen Norway Portåsen - Wildenveys Rike 
 2018 Tuzla Bosnia and Herzegovina Atelier Gallery "TOLDart"
 2018 Tuzla Bosnia and Herzegovina Youth Theater Tuzla
 2018 Drammen Norway Buskerud Kunstsenter

Awards 

 2013 Grand Prix Award, 7th biennial of miniature art Bosnia and Herzegovina 
 2013 Sculpture Award, 7th biennial of miniature art Bosnia and Herzegovina

External links

 Jasenko Đorđević Official page
 Jasenko Đorđević Facebook page
 Jasenko Đorđević Instagram page

References

Artists from Tuzla
Bosnia and Herzegovina male martial artists
1983 births
Living people